Prince Sigismund of Prussia (15 September 1864 – 18 June 1866) was the fourth child and third son of the Crown Prince and Crown Princess of Prussia, later German Emperor Frederick III and Empress Victoria. He was a grandson of William I of Prussia and Victoria, Queen of the United Kingdom.

Prince Sigismund was born at the New Palace in Potsdam, Germany, in 1864 and known as "Sigi" to his family. He died from meningitis at the New Palace on 18 June 1866, aged twenty-one months. He was buried in the royal mausoleum of the Friedenskirche at Potsdam. His mother's grief and despair were intense as his father, leading the Prussian army into battle against Austria, had taken all available doctors thus making it impossible for her to alleviate the suffering of her child or prevent his death.

Sigismund was the first grandchild of Queen Victoria to die, almost 115 years before his last cousin, Princess Alice, Countess of Athlone, who died in 1981.

Ancestry

References

Prussian princes
House of Hohenzollern
1864 births
1866 deaths
Neurological disease deaths in Germany
Royalty and nobility with disabilities
Infectious disease deaths in Germany
Deaths from meningitis
People from Potsdam
Sons of emperors
Royalty and nobility who died as children
Children of Frederick III, German Emperor
Sons of kings